United Nations Security Council Resolution 156, adopted on September 9, 1960, after receiving a report from the Secretary-General of the Organization of American States (OAS) the Council noted its approval regarding the first resolution of the Meeting of Consultations of Ministers of Foreign Affairs of the American Republics whereby an agreement was reached on the application of measures regarding the Dominican Republic.

Following the OAS' decision to break off diplomatic relations and sanction the Trujillo regime after its involvement in an assassination attempt against President Rómulo Betancourt of Venezuela, the Soviet Union provided a text draft of the resolution, however this was rejected by other members of the Council due to the issue of non-military sanctions.

The resolution was adopted by nine votes to none; the People's Republic of Poland and Soviet Union abstained.

See also
List of United Nations Security Council Resolutions 101 to 200 (1953–1965)
Assassination attempt of Rómulo Betancourt

References

External links
 
Text of the Resolution at undocs.org

 0156
1960 in the Dominican Republic
United Nations Security Council sanctions regimes
 0156
September 1960 events